Gary Marshall (born 20 April 1964) is an English former footballer who made nearly 200 appearances in the Football League playing as a winger for Bristol City, Torquay United, Carlisle United, Scunthorpe United and Exeter City.

References

1964 births
Living people
Footballers from Bristol
English footballers
Association football wingers
Exeter City F.C. players
Shepton Mallet F.C. players
Bristol City F.C. players
Torquay United F.C. players
Carlisle United F.C. players
Scunthorpe United F.C. players
Clevedon Town F.C. players
English Football League players